.ng is the Internet country code top-level domain (ccTLD) for Nigeria. It is overseen by the Nigeria Internet Registration Association (NIRA).

History 
The top-level domain was first delegated in 1995 to Ibukun Odusote at the Yaba College of Technology. She was made a life patron of the Nigeria Internet Registration Association in 2013 for her work.

Operations were initially handled by an organization in Italy, the Instituto per le Applicazioni Telematiche (today known as the ), but were later transferred to Randy Bush. In 2004, .ng was re-delegated in 2004 to a Nigerian organization, the National Information Technology Development Agency, and then in 2009, re-delegated to the Nigeria Internet Registration Association.

Second level domains
 com.ng – open domain, commercial entities and businesses
 org.ng – semi-open domain, non-commercial organizations
 gov.ng – closed domain, governmental organizations
 edu.ng – closed domain, degree awarding institutions
 net.ng – closed domain, ISP infrastructure
 sch.ng – closed domain, secondary schools
 name.ng  – open domain, individuals
 mobi.ng  – open domain, suitable for mobile devices
 mil.ng  – closed domain (Nigerian military establishments only)
 i.ng  – open domain, any purpose

In addition, NIRA themselves reserve the right to register 'premium' top level domains under .ng (for example, "google.ng").

Statistics
As of March 2022, there are 75 registrars accredited by NIRA. The most popular domain zone is .com.ng, having almost 70% of all national domains registered. The .ng domain comes next (17%) although within the zone a domain name is shorter, domain registration here costs several times more than in .com.ng while .org.ng, which is usually used by non-profit organisations, ranks third (7%).

External links

 IANA delegation record for .ng ccTLD (1995 registration)

References

Country code top-level domains
Communications in Nigeria
Computer-related introductions in 1995
Internet in Nigeria

sv:Toppdomän#N